Calgary Puck, also known as CP and sometimes styled CalgaryPuck is an online community of ice hockey enthusiasts, primarily supported by fans of the Calgary Flames.  Discussions consist of all things related to both the Flames and the National Hockey League.  Flames employees, players and local sportswriters have been known to frequent the site, including team President and CEO Ken King, and former player Andrew Ference, both of whom have interacted with members via the forums.

History
Calgary Puck was originally founded by Calgary Herald writer Mike Board. In the year 2000 Board merged the site with current owner and writer D'arcy McGrath's Fire on Ice forum. Board has since moved on, leaving McGrath at the helm as both owner and publisher of the site.  Calgary Puck bills itself as "the premier Calgary Flames fan site on the Internet."  It features news and analysis on the Flames, as well as an active message board.

Calgary Puck culture
Like many Internet forums, Calgary Puck has some cultural memes.

Calgary Puckers often refer to re-posts of the same news articles or discussions as "Fatas" or "Red Hot Fatas". This came about after numerous new threads were started simultaneously to announce that former first round draft pick Rico Fata had been claimed by the New York Rangers on waivers in the 2001–02 season. In 2018, it was announced that CP would be handing out forum awards for the first time in its history.

Flames' sixth defenceman David Hale, nicknamed "the Hale Storm" by Calgary Puck members, was an unlikely local hero during the 2008 Stanley Cup Playoffs.  Led by Calgary Puck members, fans in the Pengrowth Saddledome took to emphasizing the word "HALE" during the American national anthem when the line "...what so proudly we hailed..." was sung.  Fans as far away as Halifax, Nova Scotia helped to popularize the player most notable for having played more games than any other player without scoring a goal.

On July 8, 2022, the member by the name of "PepsiFree" recruited his 100th member into the " Calgarypuck Social Justice Mafia." Pepsi is a strong supporter of woke culture, and his achievement did not go unnoticed. Pepsi was presented with a $20 gift certificate for Tim Hortons, a well known restaurant chain with Canadian roots, named after the late popular hockey player Tim Horton by the moderators of the forum.  One such moderator (who did not wish to go on record), stated that he "gets a kick out of Pepsi driving long time members out of their mind, with his shallow, contrarian posting style. And we hipsters enjoy his condescending delivery."

Source of inside information
The CP user "Potty" had information regarding the Calgary Flames signing of Todd Bertuzzi on July 6, 2008. This was a full day before TSN announced and confirmed the signing on July 7, 2008. Calgary's Fan960 radio personality and blogger Pat Steinberg credited the site for having the information first.

Flames President and CEO Ken King has at times made himself available to talk directly to the fan base on the site under the user name "kinger", his identification was verified by the moderation team.  King made his first appearance in February 2005 to discuss fan reaction to the cancellation of the 2004–05 NHL season due to the ongoing lockout.  Former Flame Andrew Ference also interacted with fans on site under the handle "okotoker".  Upon his trade to the Boston Bruins in 2007, Ference left a message on Calgary Puck thanking the fans of Calgary for their support.

References

External links
 

Calgary Flames
Internet forums
Internet properties established in 2000